Wheeling Creek may refer to the following watercourses in the United States:

Wheeling Creek (Ohio)
Wheeling Creek (West Virginia)